Nancy Duff Campbell is an American lawyer and a founder and co-president of the National Women's Law Center.  Campbell has focused on women's law and public policy issues and has participated in the development of legislative initiatives and litigation regarding women's rights, emphasizing issues affecting low‑income women, and has authored articles on women's legal issues.

Biography 
Campbell received her undergraduate degree from Barnard College in 1965 and her law degree from New York University School of Law in 1968.

Following that she became a law professor at Georgetown University Law Center and The Catholic University of America's Columbus School of Law in Washington, D.C., and an attorney with the Center on Social Welfare Policy and Law (now the Welfare Law Center) in New York. The National Women's Law Center began when female administrative staff and law students at the Center for Law and Social Policy demanded that their pay be improved, that the center hire female lawyers, that they no longer be expected to serve coffee, and that the center create a women's program. Marcia Greenberger was hired in 1972 to start the program and Campbell joined her in 1978. In 1981, the two decided to turn the program into the separate National Women's Law Center.

Campbell participated in successful Supreme Court litigation establishing that two-parent families with unemployed mothers are entitled to AFDC benefits (Califano v. Westcott, 1979).  She was involved in the organization and leadership of the Coalition on Women and Taxes, which claimed to have "led to expanded tax assistance for single heads of household and the removal of six million low‑income families from the tax rolls in the Tax Reform Act of 1986".  She also won a case establishing the uniform right to child support enforcement services for all custodial parents without regard to income (Parents Without Partners v. Massinga).

References 

Living people
New York (state) lawyers
Barnard College alumni
New York University School of Law alumni
American women lawyers
Georgetown University Law Center faculty
Columbus School of Law faculty
American women legal scholars
American legal scholars
Year of birth missing (living people)
American women academics
21st-century American women